"Stomp!" is a song released by The Brothers Johnson from their fourth album, Light Up the Night, in early 1980. It reached number one on the Dance singles chart.  It reached number one on the R&B singles chart and peaked at number 7 on the Billboard Hot 100 in early 1980. It was a bigger success in the UK, where it entered the singles chart at number 65 on February 23, 1980, and climbed to its highest position, number 6, by March 30, 1980. It spent a total of 12 weeks on the UK Singles Chart. The song also reached number one on the New Zealand Singles Chart, staying in this position for six weeks in 1980.

Personnel
George Johnson – rhythm and lead guitar, lead and backing vocals
Louis Johnson – bass guitar, synthesizer, lead and backing vocals
Greg Phillinganes – electric piano, synthesizer
Steve Porcaro – synthesizer
Rod Temperton – electric piano
Paulinho da Costa – percussion
John Robinson – drums
Jerry Hey – trumpet
Gary Grant – trumpet
Kim Hutchcroft – saxophone (baritone, soprano, tenor)
Larry Williams – saxophone (alto, tenor), synthesizer
Bill Reichenbach Jr. – Euphonium, conducting, trombone, slide trumpet
Augie Johnson, Jim Gilstrap, Josie James, Merry Clayton, Michael Jackson, Scherrie Payne, Susaye Greene-Brown, Valerie Johnson, Quincy Jones – backing vocals

Chart history

Weekly charts

Year-end charts

Certifications

US and UK released versions
 12" US promo (SP-17111) – 6:22
 7" US edit (2216-S) – 3:58
 7" US edit (K7857) – 4:05
 12" UK (AMSP-7509-A) – 6:23
 7" UK (AMS 7509) – 6:23

In popular culture
 The song was also used in one episode of the British television series Red Dwarf, in which the main characters win a basketball game against prison guards.
 It was also used in two episodes of the American series Freaks and Geeks, when the main characters visit a store in their local mall that sells disco-themed apparel.
 "Stomp!" can be heard playing in the background during a scene in the 2008 film Yes Man.
 The song was also included in the soundtrack of the 2006 film Akeelah and the Bee.
 The track was also used on Jane Fonda's 1982 fitness cassette, alongside tracks by the Jacksons and other artists.
 The track was remade by B.G., the Prince of Rap in 1996.
 In 2006, the song was covered by Marcia Hines and her daughter Deni Hines, and was featured in Marcia's album Discothèque. It reached #43 on the ARIA Charts.
 On September 20th, 1980, Brothers Johnson performed Stomp and Treasure on Soul Train.

See also
List of number-one singles from the 1980s (New Zealand)
List of number-one dance singles of 1980 (U.S.)
List of number-one R&B singles of 1980 (U.S.)
List of post-disco artists and songs

References

External links

The Brothers Johnson songs
B.G., the Prince of Rap songs
1980 songs
1980 singles
Number-one singles in New Zealand
Song recordings produced by Quincy Jones
Songs written by Rod Temperton
A&M Records singles
Post-disco songs
Songs written by Louis Johnson (bassist)